Little Forest is a 2018 South Korean drama film directed by Yim Soon-rye and based on a manga series of the same name by Daisuke Igarashi which was first published in 2002.

After failing to pass the national qualification exam to become a teacher, Hye-won (Kim Tae-ri) abandons her part-time job in Seoul to return to the small village where she was raised.

Synopsis

The story of a young woman who returns to her childhood home, in a traditional Korean village, after leaving for the big city in pursuit of what turned out to be an elusive dream. When she returns home, her mother isn't there - but her mother's "Little Forest", the many ways in which a single mother successfully made a home for her much loved child, unfurl with a long succession of lovingly sketched details involving mostly food preparation.

The unfurling moments are lightly but lovingly shared with two childhood friends, one of whom also abandoned their elusive dream of success in the big city (Seoul) and the other who is still pursuing the small town equivalent of that elusive dream—without ever leaving home.

Cast
Kim Tae-ri as Song Hye-won
Ryu Jun-yeol as Lee Jae-ha
Moon So-ri as Mom
Jin Ki-joo as Joo Eun-sook
Park Won-sang as Mailman (special appearance)
Jung Jun-won as Hoon-yi (special appearance)

Production 
Principal photography began on January 21, 2017. It took place in a small village in South Gyeongsang Province. 
Filming wrapped up on October 26, 2017.

The film was produced with a cost of US$1.4 million.

Reception

Box office
The film came in second place at the Korean box office on the opening day by attracting 131,337 audiences. During the first weekend since the film was released at 832 screens, Little Forest drew 372,394 moviegoers accounting for 22.3 percent of the weekend's ticket sales. This accumulated to a total of 686,000 ticket sales at the end of first five days.

During the second weekend the film was viewed by 262,953 audiences and fell to third place at the Korean box office.

Little Forest remained in the third place at the Korean box office after three weekends, attracting 127,456 moviegoers during the weekend and increasing the total ticket sales to 1.35 million at the end of three weeks.

Throughout the fourth weekend, the film attracted 60,162 moviegoers and dropped to fourth place at the weekend box office.

Critical response
The Korea Herald reviewed Little Forest as "a small film with no villain, no real tension, and no real conflict", stating that the director tries to "shows us that maybe letting go can give us exactly what we’ve wanted."

Awards and nominations

References

External links

2018 films
2018 drama films
South Korean drama films
Live-action films based on manga
Cooking films
Films about food and drink
Films directed by Yim Soon-rye
Films shot in North Gyeongsang Province
2010s South Korean films